SIRIUS Travel Link is a subscription-based premium data service owned and operated by Sirius XM Holdings.

Services

Sirius XM Satellite Radio
Over 150 different radio stations, commercial free available via satellite.
SIRIUS Weather
 Temperature and Humidity, Wind Speed and Direction, Cloud Cover details.
Precipitation type, chance, and amount.
5-day city forecasts for your location including daily high and low temperatures.
Local ski resort conditions.
Detailed Weather Maps.
SIRIUS Fuel Prices (Not currently available in Canada)
Detailed fuel price information. Find the lowest price in your area.
See fuel types available.
SIRIUS Sports Scores
Game Schedules
Play-by-play details
SIRIUS Movie Listings (Not currently available in Canada)
Continually updated, detailed listings of the top 40 movies playing nationwide.
Movie descriptions, lengths and ratings.
Locations and movie showtime.

Pricing
SIRIUS Traffic w/travel link
$5.98 CDN a month
SIRIUS Traffic Only
$3.99 CDN a month
SIRIUS Travel Only
$1.99 CDN a month

SIRIUS Traffic
SIRIUS Traffic is a premium data service, providing continuous updates pertaining to circumstances on upcoming roads and highways, such as road closures, traffic accidents, and road works. SIRIUS Traffic is available without Travel Link, but all vehicles that do come with Travel Link come with SIRIUS Traffic.

Availability

Service availability varies by vehicle make and model.

The service is currently available to the following makes. 

Most Chrysler Group/Fiat Chrysler Automobiles vehicles (2011+)
Most Ford Motor Company vehicles (2009+)
Most General Motors vehicles (2013-2016)
Most Hyundai and Kia vehicles (2014+)
Most Nissan and Infiniti vehicles (2012+)
Most Porsche vehicles (2014+)
Most Subaru vehicles (2015+)
Most Volkswagen vehicles (2016+)
Certain Mercedes-Benz and Volvo models
Certain Mazda models (2021-)

See also
 Ford Sync
 MyFord Touch
 SIRIUS Satellite Radio

References

External links
 Sirius Official website (United States)
 Sirius Official website (Canada)
 Ford Travel Link Official website
 Chrysler Uconnect link Official website